The Jaguar XJR-12 is a sports-prototype race car built by the Jaguar Cars-backed Tom Walkinshaw Racing team for both Group C and IMSA Camel GTP. The XJR-12 is famous for winning the 1990 24 Hours of Le Mans race.

Weighing 900 kg and powered by a 7.0 L 60 degree SOHC V12 developing 730 horsepower / 545 kW @ 7000 rpm, and 579 ft lbf / 785 N·m @ 5500 rpm, the XJR-12 could hit 368 km/h / 229 mph.

During the 1990 24 Hours of Le Mans, the XJR-12 covered 4882.4 km at an average speed of 204.036 km/h / 126.782 mph with a maximum trap speed of 353 km/h / 219 mph.

See also
 Jaguar XJR sportscars

References

External links

XJR-12
Group C cars
IMSA GTP cars
Rear mid-engine, rear-wheel-drive vehicles
24 Hours of Le Mans race cars
Le Mans winning cars